Ignacio Cruzat (3 August 1913 – 14 March 1977) was a Chilean sports shooter. He competed at the 1948 Summer Olympics and 1956 Summer Olympics.

References

1913 births
1977 deaths
Chilean male sport shooters
Olympic shooters of Chile
Shooters at the 1948 Summer Olympics
Shooters at the 1956 Summer Olympics
Place of birth missing
20th-century Chilean people